Thomas Båtnes Braaten (born 30 June 1987) is a Norwegian football defender who currently plays for Tromsdalen UIL.

Career
Braaten join the first team in 2011 with here twin brother Vegard Braaten.

He made his first-tier debut as a substitute against Aalesund in March 2014.

In November 2014 he signed a three-year contract with Hønefoss.

Career statistics

Club

References

External links

1987 births
Living people
People from Nordreisa
Norwegian twins
Twin sportspeople
Norwegian footballers
Tromsø IL players
Alta IF players
FK Bodø/Glimt players
Hønefoss BK players
Ullensaker/Kisa IL players
Tromsdalen UIL players
Norwegian First Division players
Eliteserien players
Association football midfielders
Sportspeople from Troms og Finnmark